Beatrice Cenci is a 1956 French-Italian historical drama film directed by Riccardo Freda and starring Micheline Presle, Gino Cervi and Fausto Tozzi. It is a biopic of Beatrice Cenci, a young Roman noblewoman who murdered her abusive father, Count Francesco Cenci.

Plot 
In 1598, his son Giacomo, lover of his stepmother Lucrezia, was involved in the investigation into the death of Francesco Cenci, a violent and dissolute patrician. To defend him, Lucrezia accuses Olimpio Calvetti, Francesco's steward, who had helped Beatrice Cenci. Under torture, Beatrice also accuses Olimpio, but she is sentenced to death and beheaded in Castel Sant'Angelo. In the end, the judge also has Giacomo and Lucrezia locked up.

Cast

Release
Beatrice Cenci was distributed theatrically in Italy by Cei-Incom on  6 September 1956. It grossed a total of 223,400,000 Italian lire domestically.

References

Bibliography

External links
 

1956 films
1950s historical drama films
1950s Italian-language films
French historical drama films
Italian historical drama films
Films directed by Riccardo Freda
Films set in the 16th century
Films shot at Cinecittà Studios
Cultural depictions of Beatrice Cenci
1956 drama films
1950s Italian films
1950s French films